Anastasia Aleksandrovna Chursina (née Yakovenko; born 7 April 1995) is a Russian racing cyclist, who most recently rode for UCI Women's WorldTeam . She rode at the 2014 UCI Road World Championships.

Major results

2013
 UCI Junior Road World Championships
2nd  Road race
5th Time trial
 4th Time trial, UEC European Junior Road Championships
2014
 1st  Young rider classification Trophée d'Or Féminin
 10th Overall Tour of Adygeya
2015
 1st Grand Prix of Maykop
 2nd Overall Tour of Adygeya
1st Stage 3
 8th Time trial, UEC European Under-23 Road Championships
2016
 1st  Time trial, UEC European Under-23 Road Championships
 3rd Time trial, National Road Championships
2017
 1st  Road race, National Road Championships
 2nd Overall Tour of Zhoushan Island
 3rd Individual pursuit, National Track Championships
 6th Overall Gracia–Orlová
 6th Ljubljana–Domžale–Ljubljana TT
 10th Overall Giro della Toscana Int. Femminile – Memorial Michela Fanini
2018
 1st  Team pursuit, National Track Championships (with Gulnaz Badykova, Aleksandra Goncharova and Evgeniya Augustinas)
 2nd Madison, International Belgian Track Meeting
 3rd Overall Tour of Chongming Island
1st  Young rider classification
 5th Grand Prix de Plumelec-Morbihan Dames
 6th Ljubljana–Domžale–Ljubljana TT
 7th La Classique Morbihan
 9th La Flèche Wallonne Féminine
2019
 3rd Overall Giro della Toscana Int. Femminile – Memorial Michela Fanini
 4th Trofeo Alfredo Binda-Comune di Cittiglio
 4th Donostia San Sebastian Klasikoa
 7th Grand Prix Gazipaşa
2020
 2nd Grand Prix Develi
 2nd Grand Prix World's Best High Altitude
 4th Grand Prix Cappadocia
 7th Overall Women's Herald Sun Tour
 7th Grand Prix Mount Erciyes
2021
 1st Stage 2 Vuelta a Burgos Feminas
 7th Grand Prix Develi

References

External links
 
 

1995 births
Living people
Russian female cyclists
Cyclists from Saint Petersburg
Cyclists at the 2015 European Games
European Games competitors for Russia
21st-century Russian women